The Madhyapara Massacre was the massacre of over 370 unarmed Bengali Hindu residents of Madhyapara and other nearby villages under the authority of the Palong police station in the Faridpur district of East Pakistan, by the occupying Pakistani army on 22 May 1971. An estimated 370 people were killed in the massacre.  In 1971, the villages of Madhyapara, Kashabhog & Rudrakar were under the authority of the Palong police station of Madaripur sub-division in Faridpur District. They are now under the jurisdiction of the Shariatpur municipality in Shariatpur Sadar Upazila of Shariatpur District.  The three villages at the time were largely Hindu-inhabited and Madhyapara was totally Hindu.

Memorial 
In 2010, a memorial was erected in  Madhyapara Village in memory of the victims. It lists the names of the 73 victims who were identified up to that point.

References 

1971 Bangladesh genocide
Massacres in 1971
Massacres of Bengali Hindus in East Pakistan
Persecution of Hindus
Persecution by Muslims
1971 in Bangladesh
1971 in Pakistan
Massacres committed by Pakistan in East Pakistan
May 1971 events in Asia